Blake Smith  (born December 9, 1987) is an American former professional baseball pitcher. He played in Major League Baseball (MLB) for the Chicago White Sox in 2016.

Career
Smith attended Thomas Downey High School in Modesto, California, and then the University of California. He was drafted by the Los Angeles Dodgers in the 2nd round of the 2009 MLB draft as an outfielder. He began his career with the Ogden Dodgers of the Pioneer League in 2009 and was promoted to the Class-A Great Lakes Loons in 2010, where he hit .281 with 19 homers and 76 RBI in 115 games. In 2011 with the Advanced-A Rancho Cucamonga Quakes of the California League he hit .294 with  16 homers and 63 RBI in 74 games.

Smith was promoted to the AA Chattanooga Lookouts for 2012, hitting .267 with 13 homers and 65 RBI. He began 2014 in Chattanooga also but struggled this season, hitting only .233 in 74 games with only 6 RBI. The Dodgers made the decision to convert him to pitcher, so he was demoted to Rancho Cucamonga where he appeared in 21 games with a 7.78 ERA. He posted better numbers in 2014, split between the Quakes and Lookouts, he had a 3.82 ERA in 48 games. The Dodgers assigned him to the Glendale Desert Dogs in the Arizona Fall League after the season. He was assigned to the AA Tulsa Drillers of the Texas League to start the 2015 season. In 16 games for the Drillers, he had a 1.62 ERA and three saves.

Smith was traded to the Chicago White Sox on May 22, 2015, in exchange for Eric Surkamp. On December 10, 2015, he was selected by the San Diego Padres in the Rule 5 draft. The Padres returned Smith to the White Sox before Opening Day in 2016.

Smith was promoted to the Major Leagues on September 6, 2016, and made his major league debut on September 10, 2016. He signed a minor league contract with Chicago on December 17, 2016. He was released on March 27, 2017.

References

External links

Living people
1987 births
Sportspeople from Modesto, California
Baseball players from California
Major League Baseball pitchers
Chicago White Sox players
California Golden Bears baseball players
Arizona League Dodgers players
Ogden Raptors players
Great Lakes Loons players
Rancho Cucamonga Quakes players
Chattanooga Lookouts players
Adelaide Bite players
Glendale Desert Dogs players
Tulsa Drillers players
Birmingham Barons players
Charlotte Knights players
American expatriate baseball players in Australia